Anjanapura is a suburb located in the southern part of the city of Bangalore. The area is located to the east of Kanakapura Road and is in close proximity to NICE Road. The Green Line of the Namma Metro will have a terminal station in Anjanapura.

References

External links

Neighbourhoods in Bangalore